Guttmacher is a surname. Notable people with the surname include:

Alan Edward Guttmacher (born 1949), pediatrician and medical geneticist. former director of the National Institute of Child Health (NICHD).
Alan Frank Guttmacher (1898–1974), American obstetrician and gynecologist
Manfred Guttmacher (1898–1966), forensic psychiatrist

See also
Guttmacher Institute

Jewish surnames
German-language surnames